This is the chapter roll of Alpha Pi Mu, the honor society for Industrial and Systems Engineering students. In all but two cases, chapters of this society are named after each school, and not given Greek designations. Two chapters, at Syracuse and Iowa State, have Greek letter names to recognize previous local societies there.

Active chapters are indicated by bold text, inactive chapters are italicized. References cited within each listing or below.

Chapters of Alpha Pi Mu

References
Unless otherwise cited, information from the ACHS website or Baird's Manual, 20th Edition.

External links
The Alpha Pi Mu ACHS webpage
Alpha Pi Mu's national webpage

Lists of chapters of United States student societies by society